Jerry Lee Norman (July 16, 1936 – July 7, 2012) was an American sinologist and linguist known for his studies of Chinese dialects and historical phonology, particularly on the Min Chinese dialects, and also of the Manchu language. Norman had a large impact on Chinese linguistics, and was largely responsible for the identification of the importance of the Min Chinese dialects in linguistic research into Old Chinese.

Life and career
Jerry Norman was born on July 16, 1936, in Watsonville, California. His family were migrant farmers who had fled the Dust Bowl conditions of Oklahoma in the mid-1930s.  Norman entered the University of Chicago in the autumn of 1954 and majored in Russian, but was forced to withdraw after two years because of financial problems.  He was briefly a Catholic novitiate, then joined the U.S. Army and began studying at the Defense Language Institute Foreign Language Center in Monterey, California, where he was first introduced to the Chinese language.

After completing his military service, Norman enrolled at the University of California, Berkeley, graduating with a B.A. in 1961. He then continued at Berkeley as a graduate student, studying Chinese under the prominent Chinese linguist Y. R. Chao as well as Manchu and Mongolian under the American scholar James Bosson (1933–2016).  He earned an M.A. in 1965, and after working with Chinese linguist Leo Chen on a glossary of the Fuzhou dialect, in 1966 he joined the Chinese Linguistics Project at Princeton University as a staff linguist.  While at Princeton, Norman traveled  to Taiwan to perform in field research on Taiwanese Hokkien, and in 1969 he received a Ph.D. from Berkeley with a dissertation entitled "The Kienyang Dialect of Fukien".

Norman was promoted to assistant professor after completing his Ph.D. in 1969.  While at Princeton, Norman met and married Stella Chen, and together they had four children.  In 1972, Norman moved with his family to Seattle, Washington to join the faculty of the Department of Asian Languages and Literature at the University of Washington, where he remained until his retirement in 1998.  Norman's scholarship focused on the Min dialects of Chinese, and was largely responsible for its recognition as an important tool for reconstructing the phonology of Old Chinese.  He was a passionate student of Manchu history and literature, and was one of the last North American scholars to be fluent and literate in Manchu.

He died of idiopathic pulmonary fibrosis in Seattle on July 7, 2012.

Selected works
 Norman, Jerry (1969), "The Kienyang Dialect of Fukien" (Ph.D. dissertation, University of California, Berkeley).
  1973. "Tonal Development in Min"; Journal of Chinese Linguistics 1–2: 222–238.
  1974. "The Initials of Proto-Min"; Journal of Chinese Linguistics 2-1: 27–36.
  1974. "Structure of Sibe Morphology"; Central Asian Journal.
  1976. With Mei Tsu-lin. "The Austroasiatics in Ancient South China: Some Lexical Evidence"; Monumenta Serica 32: 274–301, .
  1978. A Concise Manchu-English Lexicon.  University of Washington Press. .
  1979. "Chronological Strata in the Min Dialects"; Fangyan 方言 1979.4: 268–274.
  1980. "Yongan fanyan" 永安方言; Shumu Jikan 书目季刊 14–2: 113–165.
  1981. "The Proto-Min Finals"; 中央研究院国际汉学会议论文集 语言文字组: 35–73.
  1984. "Three Min Etymologies"; Cahiers de Linguistique Asie Orientale 13–2: 175–189. .
  1986. "Min-Bei fangyan de di san tao qing saiyin he qing casaiyin 闽北方言的第三套清塞音和清擦塞音"; Zhongguo Yuwen 中国语文 1986.1: 38–41.
  1988. Chinese. Cambridge University Press, 1988. .
  1991. "The Mǐn Dialects in Historical Perspective"; Languages and Dialects of China, edited by William S-Y. Wang, pp. 325–360. Published by Journal of Chinese Linguistics. 
  1995. With Weldon South Coblin. "A New Approach to Chinese Historical Linguistics"; Journal of the American Oriental Society 115–4: 576–584.
  1996. "Tonal Development in the Jennchyan Dialect"; Yuen Ren Society Treasury of Chinese Dialect Data 2: 7–41.
  2000. With Gilbert Louis Mattos. translation of Chinese Writing by Qiu Xigui. Society for the Study of Early China and the Institute of East Asian Studies, University of California. 
  2002. "A Glossary of the Lianduentsuen Dialect"; Short Chinese Dialect Reports 1: 339–394.
  2006. "Min Animal Body Parts"; Bulletin of Chinese Linguistics 1–1: 133–143.
  2007. "汉语方言田野调查与音韵学"; Beijing Daxue Xuebao 北京大学学报 44.2: 91–94.
  2013. A Comprehensive Manchu-English Dictionary. Harvard University Asia Center.

References

Citations

Works cited 

 
 

1936 births
2012 deaths
Linguists from the United States
American sinologists
Manchurologists
University of Washington faculty